Kathryn Casault is a Canadian make-up artist. She is most noted for her work on the film Babine, for which she won the Jutra Award for Best Makeup at the 11th Jutra Awards in 2009.

She has also been a Jutra/Iris nominee for 13 other films, and a three-time Genie Award and Canadian Screen Award nominee for Best Makeup.

Awards

References

External links

Canadian make-up artists
Canadian women in film
French Quebecers
Living people
Year of birth missing (living people)